Prochoerodes lineola, the large maple spanworm,  is a moth of the family Geometridae. It is found from Nova Scotia to Florida, west to Texas and north to Alberta.

The wingspan is 35–50 mm. Adults have a wing colour which varies from yellowish to light brown or even dark brown, with or without blackish shading. They are on wing from April to October in the south and from July to September in the north.

The larvae feed on the leaves of a wide range of plants, including apple, birch, blueberry, cherry, currant, geranium, grass, maple, oak, poplar, soybean, sweetfern, walnut and willow.

Subspecies
Prochoerodes lineola lineola
Prochoerodes lineola incurvata (Guenée, 1857)

References

Moths described in 1781
Ourapterygini
Moths of North America